In computer science, a stream is a sequence of data elements made available over time. A stream can be thought of as items on a conveyor belt being processed one at a time rather than in large batches.

Streams are processed differently from batch data – normal functions cannot operate on streams as a whole, as they have potentially unlimited data, and formally, streams are codata (potentially unlimited), not data (which is finite). Functions that operate on a stream, producing another stream, are known as filters, and can be connected in pipelines, analogously to function composition. Filters may operate on one item of a stream at a time, or may base an item of output on multiple items of input, such as a moving average.

Examples
The term "stream" is used in a number of similar ways:
 "Stream editing", as with sed, awk, and perl. Stream editing processes a file or files, in-place, without having to load the file(s) into a user interface. One example of such use is to do a search and replace on all the files in a directory, from the command line.
 On Unix and related systems based on the C language, a stream is a source or sink of data, usually individual bytes or characters. Streams are an abstraction used when reading or writing files, or communicating over network sockets. The standard streams are three streams made available to all programs.
 I/O devices can be interpreted as streams, as they produce or consume potentially unlimited data over time.
 In object-oriented programming, input streams are generally implemented as iterators.
 In the Scheme language and some others, a stream is a lazily evaluated or delayed sequence of data elements. A stream can be used similarly to a list, but later elements are only calculated when needed. Streams can therefore represent infinite sequences and series.
 In the Smalltalk standard library and in other programming languages as well, a stream is an external iterator. As in Scheme, streams can represent finite or infinite sequences.
 Stream processing — in parallel processing, especially in graphic processing, the term stream is applied to hardware as well as software. There it defines the quasi-continuous flow of data that is processed in a dataflow programming language as soon as the program state meets the starting condition of the stream.

Applications

Streams can be used as the underlying data type for channels in interprocess communication.

Other uses
The term "stream" is also applied to file system forks, where multiple sets of data are associated with a single filename. Most often, there is one main stream that makes up the normal file data, while additional streams contain metadata. Here "stream" is used to indicate "variable size data", as opposed to fixed size metadata such as extended attributes, but differs from "stream" as used otherwise, meaning "data available over time, potentially infinite".

See also
 Bitstream
 Codata
 Data stream
 Data stream mining
 Flow (computer networking)
 Network socket
 Streaming algorithm
 Streaming media
 Stream processing

References

External links
 An Approximate L1-Difference Algorithm for Massive Data Streams, 1995 Feigenbaum et al.

Computer data
Inter-process communication

ja:ストリーム (プログラミング)
ru:Поток данных
tr:Stream